De la Bédoyère is a surname of French origin. People with that name include:

 Charles de la Bédoyère (1786–1815), French General during the reign of Emperor Napoleon I
 Guy de la Bédoyère (born 1957), British historian
 Michael de la Bédoyère (1900–1973), English author, editor and journalist

Surnames of French origin